The mayor of Mississauga is the head of Mississauga City Council and chief executive officer of the municipal government. The mayor is elected alongside city council every four years on the fourth Monday of October; there are no term limits. While in office, mayors are styled His/Her Worship.

Bonnie Crombie has served as the 6th and current mayor of Mississauga since taking office on December 1, 2014, following the 2014 mayoral election. Crombie was re-elected to a third term in 2022.

Mayors of Mississauga 

This list includes the two mayors of the Town of Mississauga (existing from 1968 to 1973), and the four mayors of the City of Mississauga (1974 to present):

Town of Mississauga

Before 1968, Mississauga was led by reeves for the townships of Clarkson, Cooksville, Dixie, Erindale, Lakeview, Lorne Park, Malton, Meadowvale, Sheridan, and Toronto Township.

City of Mississauga
The City of Mississauga was formed with the merger of the towns of Mississauga, Port Credit and Streetsville:

References 

Mississauga mayors